is a Japanese politician who has served as leader of Kibō no Tō from 2019 to 2021. He served as Minister of Education, Culture, Sports, Science and Technology in the Cabinet of Junichiro Koizumi and later as Minister of Land, Infrastructure, Transport and Tourism under Tarō Asō. After only four days in office he resigned due to a series of gaffes. Appointed on 24 September 2008, he resigned on 28 September 2008. After being de-endorsed by the LDP he lost his seat in the 2009 general election, eventually returning to the diet as a member of the Japan Restoration Party in the 2012 general election. He lost his seat again in the 2014 general election.

Background
Graduating from the Faculty of Law at the University of Tokyo in 1966, Nakayama joined the Ministry of Finance. In 1986 he was elected to the House of Representatives for the first time, and in September 2004, he became the Minister of Education, Culture, Sports, Science and Technology. He is married to Kyoko Nakayama, also a conservative politician.

Conservative positions
Nakayama is affiliated with the Nippon Kaigi, a revisionist, ultra-nationalist organization.

When he was a member of the Liberal Democratic Party, Nakayama was prominent in efforts to censor sections of junior high textbooks in Japan that made references to comfort women. In 2013, he continues to deny that women were forced to work in brothels during wartime. He claims that the Nanjing Massacre was a complete fabrication, was a supporter of right-wing filmmaker Satoru Mizushima's 2007 film The Truth about Nanjing, which denied that the massacre ever occurred. During the first administration of Prime Minister Shinzō Abe, Nakayama made efforts to revise the Kono statement of 1993.

He has continued to express right-wing conservative visions of history.

As a four-day cabinet minister
In the Cabinet of Prime Minister Taro Aso, appointed on 24 September 2008, Nakayama was appointed as Minister of Construction and Transport. He made several controversial statements since his appointment, such as saying: "I will stand at the forefront to destroy the Japan Teachers' Union, which is a cancer for Japanese education". In a press conference related to his Minister of Tourism portfolio, he declared that Japan is basically "ethnically homogeneous," which greatly angered the Ainu, an indigenous ethnic minority living mostly in Northern Japan. He also said that Japanese people "do not like nor desire foreigners". He resigned on 27 September 2008.

Loss of LDP confidence and loss of lower house seat
In the 2009 general election the LDP was reluctant to run Nakayama as a candidate. He ran as an independent and lost his seat.

Move to the Sunrise Party of Japan, Japan Restoration Party, and Party for Future Generations
On 21 June 2010 Nakayama and his wife Kyoko announced that they would move from the Liberal Democratic Party to the Sunrise Party of Japan. He ran for the House of Councilors in the July 11 2010 election, but was not elected. The Sunrise Party became part of the Japan Restoration Party, and Nariaki returned to the Diet in the 2012 general election. When Shintaro Ishihara's group left that party to form the Party for Future Generations he and his wife went too. He lost his seat again in the 2014 general election.

References

External links 
 Minister of Education, Culture, Science and Technology Prime Minister of Japan and His Cabinet

1943 births
Living people
People from Miyazaki Prefecture
University of Tokyo alumni
Spouses of Japanese politicians
Members of the House of Representatives (Japan)
Education ministers of Japan
Ministers of Land, Infrastructure, Transport and Tourism of Japan
Members of Nippon Kaigi
Kibō no Tō politicians
Nanjing Massacre deniers
21st-century Japanese politicians
Politicians from Miyazaki Prefecture
Historical negationism
Culture ministers of Japan
Sports ministers of Japan
Technology ministers of Japan
Science ministers of Japan